This is a list of team records for the Chicago White Sox professional baseball team.

Single season records

Batting
Batting average: Luke Appling, .388
On-base percentage: Frank Thomas, .487
Slugging percentage: Frank Thomas, .729
OPS: Frank Thomas, 1.217
At bats: Orlando Cabrera, 661
Runs: Johnny Mostil, 135
Hits: Eddie Collins, 224
Total bases: Albert Belle, 399
Doubles: Albert Belle, 48
Triples: Shoeless Joe Jackson, 21
Home runs: Albert Belle, 49
Runs batted in: Albert Belle, 152
Walks: Frank Thomas, 138
Strikeouts: Adam Dunn, 222
Stolen bases: Rudy Law, 77
Singles: Eddie Collins, 170
Runs created: Frank Thomas, 163
Extra-base hits: Albert Belle, 99
Times on base: Frank Thomas, 317
Hit by pitch: Minnie Miñoso & Carlos Quentin, 23 &
Sacrifice hits: Buck Weaver, 44
Intentional walks: Frank Thomas, 29
Grounded into double plays: George Bell, 29,
At bats per strikeout: Eddie Collins, 63.1
At bats per home run: Frank Thomas, 10.5
Outs:  Juan Pierre, 515

Pitching
ERA:  Ed Walsh, 1.27
Wins:  Ed Walsh, 40
Won-loss %:  Jason Bere, .857
WHIP:  Ed Walsh, .820,
Hits allowed/9IP:  Hoyt Wilhelm, 5.50
Walks/9IP:  LaMarr Hoyt, 1.07
Strikeouts/9IP:  Chris Sale, 11.9
Games:  Wilbur Wood, 88
Saves: Bobby Thigpen, 57
Innings:  Ed Walsh, 464
Strikeouts: Chris Sale, 274
Complete games:  Ed Walsh, 42
Shutouts:  Ed Walsh, 11
Home runs allowed:  Floyd Bannister, 38
Walks allowed:  Vern Kennedy, 147
Hits allowed:  Wilbur Wood, 381
Strikeout to walk:  Chris Sale, 6.5
Losses:  Patsy Flaherty, 25
Earned runs allowed:  Dickey Kerr, 162
Batters faced:  Ed Walsh, 1,755
Games finished:  Bobby Thigpen, 73

Career records

Batting
Batting average:  Shoeless Joe Jackson, .340
On-base percentage:  Frank Thomas, .427
Slugging percentage:  Frank Thomas, .568
OPS:  Frank Thomas, .995
Games:  Luke Appling, 2,422
At bats:  Luke Appling, 8,856
Runs:  Frank Thomas, 1,327
Hits:  Luke Appling, 2,749
Total bases:  Paul Konerko, 4,010
Doubles:  Frank Thomas, 447
Home runs:  Frank Thomas, 448
Runs batted in:  Frank Thomas, 1,465
Walks:  Frank Thomas, 1,466
Strikeouts:  Paul Konerko, 1,349
Stolen bases:  Eddie Collins, 368
Singles:  Luke Appling, 2,162
Runs created:  Frank Thomas, 1,700
Extra-base hits:  Frank Thomas, 906
Times on base:  Luke Appling, 4,062
Hit by pitch:  Minnie Miñoso, 145
Sacrifice hits:  Eddie Collins, 341
Sacrifice flies:  Frank Thomas, 109
Intentional walks:  Frank Thomas, 162
Grounded into double plays:  Paul Konerko, 271
At bats per strikeout:  Nellie Fox, 44.2
At bats per home run:  Frank Thomas, 15.5
Outs:  Nellie Fox, 6,470

Pitching
ERA:  Ed Walsh, 1.81 (also Major League Record)
Wins:  Ted Lyons, 260
Won-loss %:  Lefty Williams, .648
WHIP:  Hoyt Wilhelm, .935
Hits allowed/9IP:  Hoyt Wilhelm, 6.19
Walks/9IP:  Nick Altrock, 1.49
Strikeouts/9IP:  Chris Sale, 10.3
Games:  Red Faber, 669
Saves:  Bobby Thigpen, 201
Innings:  Ted Lyons, 4,161
Strikeouts:  Billy Pierce, 1,796
Games started:  Ted Lyons, 484
Complete games:  Ted Lyons, 356
Shutouts:  Ed Walsh, 57
Home runs allowed:  Billy Pierce, 241
Walks allowed:  Red Faber, 1,213
Hits allowed:  Ted Lyons, 4,489
Strikeout to walk:  Chris Sale, 4.69
Losses:  Ted Lyons, 230
Earned runs allowed:  Ted Lyons, 1,696
Wild pitches:  Ed Walsh, 83
Hit batsmen:  Red Faber, 103
Batters faced:  Ted Lyons, 17,846
Games finished:  Bobby Thigpen, 348

See also
List of Major League Baseball franchise postseason streaks
List of Chicago White Sox award winners and league leaders

References

Records
Chicago W